The Luray Norfolk and Western Passenger Station is a historic train station located in Luray, Virginia, United States.  The Shenandoah Valley Railroad reached Luray in 1881 and constructed a station near where the present station is located.  Shortly after the Norfolk and Western Railway absorbed the Shenandoah Valley Railroad in 1890, plans arose to construct a new station in Luray.  This station, which still stands, was constructed in 1906 and was designed by the railroad's Chief Engineer, Charles S. Churchill.  The structure was partially destroyed by fire in 1908 when it was struck by lightning; however, it was soon thereafter reconstructed according to the original design.  The station is a one-story brick structure featuring a hip roof.  The building was converted to freight use around 1960 and was sold to the town of Luray by the Norfolk and Western's successor, the Norfolk Southern Railway, in 1999.

The station was listed on the National Register of Historic Places on January 27, 2000.  It is a contributing property in the Luray Downtown Historic District.

Footnotes

References

Railway stations on the National Register of Historic Places in Virginia
Railway stations in the United States opened in 1906
Buildings and structures in Page County, Virginia
National Register of Historic Places in Page County, Virginia
Norfolk and Western Railway stations
Individually listed contributing properties to historic districts on the National Register in Virginia